William Perry French Morris (1878-1960) was an Anglican priest and school headmaster. He founded the Church of England Grammar School in Brisbane, Queensland, Australia.

References 

Australian Anglican priests
1878 births
1960 deaths
Australian headmasters
People educated at Trinity College (University of Melbourne)